KAPA (100.3 FM) is a radio station broadcasting a Hawaiian AC format. Licensed to Hilo, Hawaii, United States, the station serves the Hilo area.  The station is currently owned by Pacific Radio Group, Inc.

History
The station went on the air as KIPA-FM on November 6, 1987.  On July 31, 1992, the station changed its call sign to KHWI. On October 21, 1999, KHWI changed calls to the current KAPA.

References

External links

APA
Hawaiian-music formatted radio stations
Radio stations established in 1987
1987 establishments in Hawaii